Strigulales is an order of lichen-forming fungi in the class Dothideomycetes. It contains two families: Strigulaceae and Tenuitholiascaceae, with a combined total of 115 species. The order was proposed by Robert Lücking, Matthew Nelsen, and Kevin Hyde in 2013. Most species in the order are foliicolous, that is, they grow on plant leaves.

Families and genera
According to a recent (2022) review of fungal classification, Strigulales contains 15 genera and a total of 115 species across two families.
Strigulaceae 
Dichoporis – 18 spp.
Flagellostrigula – 1 sp.
Flavobathelium – 1 sp.
Oletheriostrigula – 1 sp.
Phyllobathelium – 5 spp.
Phyllocharis – 1 sp.
Phyllocraterina – 2 spp.
Phylloporis – 9 spp.
Puiggariella – 4 spp.
Raciborskiella – 2 spp.
Racoplaca – 5 spp.
Serusiauxiella – 3 spp.
Strigula – ca. 30 spp.
Swinscowia – 34 spp.

Tenuitholiascaceae 
Tenuitholiascus – 1 sp.

References

Dothideomycetes
Ascomycota orders
Lichen orders
Taxa described in 2013
Taxa named by Robert Lücking